Lothar Gericke (born 28 February 1950) is a retired German swimmer. He competed at the 1968 Summer Olympics in the 4×100 m freestyle relay and finished in fifth place.

References

1950 births
Living people
German male swimmers
German male freestyle swimmers
Olympic swimmers of East Germany
Swimmers at the 1968 Summer Olympics
Swimmers from Berlin